Milan Milijaš (Serbian Cyrillic: Милан Милијаш; born 12 October 1976) is a Serbian former professional footballer who played as a defender.

Statistics

External links
 
 

1976 births
Living people
People from Zemun
Footballers from Belgrade
Association football defenders
Expatriate footballers in Spain
FK Partizan players
FK Voždovac players
FK Zemun players
Málaga CF players
OFK Beograd players
RCD Mallorca players
Segunda División players
Serbia and Montenegro expatriate footballers
Serbia and Montenegro footballers
Serbia and Montenegro expatriate sportspeople in Spain
Serbia and Montenegro under-21 international footballers
Serbian footballers
Serbian SuperLiga players
FK Partizan non-playing staff